Hteinbin Cemetery (also spelt Htein Pin Cemetery), located in Hlaingthaya Township, is one of Yangon's largest cemeteries. The cemetery is maintained by the Yangon City Development Committee's environmental maintenance department. Hteinbin Cemetery consists of various ethnic and religious cemeteries, including those of the Karen, Burmese Muslims, former Shan saophas, Christians, Hindus and Sino-Burmese.

Notable burials
 Ko Ko Maung

See also
 Yayway Cemetery

References

Cemeteries in Myanmar
Buildings and structures in Yangon